South Korean singer Park Hyo-shin has released seven studio albums, one live album, three compilation albums, one cover album, and twenty singles.

Albums

Studio albums

Live albums

Compilation albums

Cover albums

Singles

As lead artist

As collaborative artist

Other charted songs

Guest appearances

Soundtrack appearances

Music videos

Notes

References

Discographies of South Korean artists